Kevin Prosch is an American Christian musician.  He plays a wide variety of musical instruments including the guitar, mandolin, keys, piano, and a range of more exotic world music instruments, along with incorporating electronics.

His songs include “Harp In My Heart", “Highest Praise”, “So Come”, "Show Your Power" and "Love Is All You Need". Prosch has collaborated with a number of other musicians including Bryn Haworth. Prosch's 1995 album, Tumbling Ground, was produced by Ethan Johns.

He also produces Christian music artists under his own label "Third Ear Music". Prosch served as the worship pastor with John Wimber in California in the early years of the Vineyard Church movement . More recently he was senior associate pastor of More Church in Amarillo, Texas until early 2013 . Prosch now resides in the Kansas City, Missouri area.

Discography 
2009: The High Places and Artifacts (with Leonard Jones)
2009: The Gift (with Heidi Baker)
2007: True Riches (with Keith Miller)
2006: The Language of Eden (with Todd Bentley) 
2002: Palanquin (Forerunner Records)
1998: Reckless Mercy (Vertical Music)
1997: Journeys Of Life (7th Time Music)
1997: The Finer Things in Life (with Bryn Haworth)
1996: Kiss The Son (7th Time Music)
1995: Tumbling Ground (with The Black Peppercorns) Produced by Ethan Johns (7th Time Music, UPC/EAN: 649567050020)
Track list: Please, She Walks In Beauty, Love Is All You Need, Tumbling Ground, Thinking Of You, Come To Me, Hopelessly In Love, A Song For Natalia, Whang Dang Do
1993: Come To The Light (7th Time Music) 
1991: Even So Come (Vineyard Music Group)
1991: Save Us Oh God (Featured Worship Leader) (Vineyard Music Group)
1990: King of Saints (Featured Worship Leader) (Vineyard Music Group)
1988: Hear Our Cry (Featured Worship Leader) (Vineyard Music Group)

References

External links
The Fascinating Life and Music of Kevin Prosch - an in-depth biographic interview with Mike Morrell on the Homebrewed Christianity podcast

American male songwriters
Living people
Association of Vineyard Churches
Year of birth missing (living people)